Savonia or Savonian may refer to:

Savonia (historical province), a historical province of Finland when it was part of the Kingdom of Sweden
Savonian dialects, forms of Finnish language spoken in Savonia and other parts of Eastern Finland
Savonian people, Finnish people descending from the inhabitants of historical province of Savonia
Savonia University of Applied Sciences, a university in Northern Savonia, Finland
Hotel Savonia, a Best Western chain hotel in Kuopio, Finland

See also
 Pohjois-Savo (Northern Savonia), a present-day region of Finland
 Etelä-Savo (Southern Savonia), a present-day region of Finland

Language and nationality disambiguation pages